So Drama! Entertainment (previously SAFRA Radio) is a Singapore media company owned by SAFRA National Service Association. In their portfolio are four brands - 883Jia, Power 98, SAF Music and Drama Company and PIONEER (Magazine).

PIONEER 
Owned and managed by So Drama! Entertainment, an entity under SAFRA, PIONEER provides the latest news on the Ministry of Defence (MINDEF) and the SAF, perspectives on defence and security issues that matter to Singapore as well as a glimpse into defence happenings and defence technology around the world.

The Music & Drama Company (MDC) 
The Music & Drama Company (MDC) is where local talent gets discovered. Well-known Singaporean artistes like Dick Lee, JJ Lin, Jeremy Monteiro, Najib Ali & Nathan Hartono have all passed through the gates of MDC during their National Service or as they started their professional careers.

MDC was first formed in 1973 to strengthen the morale of SAF soldiers through live entertainment. It has, come a long way from performing on a makeshift stage formed by three-tonners, to a highly professional company capable of staging multimedia song and dance performances, musicals, music videos, and much more. Even as MDC evolves, it continues with its proud heritage of performing for soldiers, with soldiers.

Radio 
Formerly known as SAFRA Radio, it was renamed as So Drama! Entertainment in 2017. According to the company, it chose the name “So Drama!” because it’s a quintessentially Singaporean phrase that describes something which moves and amuses you. 

The company runs two radio stations – 88.3Jia and Power 98 Love Songs. 88.3Jia first rode the airwaves in 1995, before relaunching in 2007 as Singapore's only bilingual station. Featuring both Mandarin and English hits round the clock, it’s now bigger and better as the “upsized” 88.3Jia experience offers more of everything. POWER 98 has been entertaining radio audiences since 1994. Relaunched as POWER 98 LOVE SONGS in 2019, it’s now the first and only English station playing love songs all day.

Additional stations from both 88.3Jia and Power 98 can be heard through their portal Camokakis, which include stations dedicated to Cantopop (88.3Jia Cantopop) and K-pop (88.3Jia K-pop) and classic hits (Power 98 Retro).

FM stations

References

External links
So Drama! Entertainment website

 
Military of Singapore
Mass media companies established in 1994
Entertainment companies established in 1973
1973 establishments in Singapore